Douglas Bell may refer to:

Douglas John Bell (1893–1918), South African World War I flying ace
Doug Bell (game designer) (born 1961), American computer game developer
Doug Bell (sportscaster) (born 1961), American sportscaster
Dougie Bell (born 1959), Scottish footballer
Douglas Bell (athlete) (1908–1944), English athlete
Douglas Bell (politician) (1926–2021), Canadian politician 
L. Douglas Bell (born 1958), American physicist

See also
George Douglas Hutton Bell (1905–1993), British plant breeder